Vitex doniana is a tree native to the Afrotropics. Its fruits are one of several fruits called black plums. This tree is often grown for its fruits.

Description
Its fruits are at most  in length. The insect Rastrococcus invadens is a pest to this plant.

V. doniana is known as plem in Ethiopia, uchakoro in Nigeria, mfudu and mfuu in Eswatini, mfuu in Tanzania, munyamazi and yuelo in Uganda and kashilumbalu in Zambia.

V. doniana is one of the few plants notable for its phytoecdysteroid content, Ochieng et al. 2013 finding it is one of the few with more than 0.001% by dry weight. Specifically they find 21-hydroxyshidasterone, 11b-hydroxy-20-deoxyshidasterone and 2,3-acetonide-24-hydroxyecdysone.

References

doniana
Fruit
Garden plants of Africa